A pointing stick (or trackpoint, also referred to generically as a nub or nipple) is a small analog stick used as a pointing device typically mounted centrally in a computer keyboard. Like other pointing devices such as mice, touchpads or trackballs, operating system software translates manipulation of the device into movements of the pointer or cursor on the monitor. Unlike other pointing devices, it reacts to sustained force or strain rather than to gross movement, so it is called an "isometric" pointing device. IBM introduced it commercially in 1992 on its laptops under the name "TrackPoint", patented in 1997 (patent expired in 2017).

The pointing stick senses applied force by using two pairs of resistive strain gauges. A pointing stick can be used by pushing with the fingers in the general direction the user wants the cursor to move. The velocity of the pointer depends on the applied force so increasing pressure causes faster movement. The relation between pressure and cursor or pointer speed can be adjusted, just as mouse speed is adjusted.

On a QWERTY keyboard, the stick is typically embedded between the G, H and B keys, and the mouse buttons are placed just below the space bar. The mouse buttons can be operated right-handed or left-handed due to their placement below the keyboard along the centerline. This pointing device has also appeared next to screens on compact-sized laptops such as the Toshiba Libretto and Sony VAIO UX.

Variants 
Pointing sticks typically have a replaceable rubber cap, called a nub, which can be a slightly rough "eraser head" material or another shape. 

The cap is red on ThinkPads, but is also found in other colors on other machines. For example, it may be gray, pink, black or blue on some Dell models, blue on some HP/Compaq laptops, and green or gray on most Toshiba laptops produced before the 2000s.

Button configurations vary depending on vendor and laptop model. ThinkPads have a prominent middle mouse button, but some models have no physical buttons. Toshiba employs concentric arcs.

In the early 1990s, Zenith Data Systems shipped a number of laptop computers equipped with a device called "J-Mouse", which essentially used a special keyswitch under the J key to allow the J keycap to be used as a pointing stick.

In addition to appearing between the G, H and B keys on a QWERTY keyboard, these devices or similar can also appear on gaming devices as an alternative to a D-pad or analog stick. On certain Toshiba Libretto mini laptops, the pointing stick was located next to the display. IBM sold a mouse with a pointing stick in the location where a scroll wheel is common now.

Optical pointing sticks are also used on some Ultrabook tablet hybrids, such as the Sony Duo 11, ThinkPad Tablet and Samsung Ativ Q.

On the Gateway 2000 Liberty laptop the pointing stick is above the enter key on the right side of the keyboard.

A pointing stick was featured in the New Nintendo 3DS as a secondary analog stick, known as the C-Stick.

Design challenges 
The IBM TrackPoint III and the TrackPoint IV have a feature called Negative Inertia that causes the pointer's velocity to "overreact" when it is accelerated or decelerated. Negative Inertia is intended to avoid the feeling of inertia or sluggishness when starting or stopping movement. Usability tests at IBM have shown that it is easier for users to position the pointer with Negative Inertia, and performance is 7.8% better.

Another challenge with pointing stick design is identification of the zero position (the position where no motion is desired). Because the amount of motion is small, the sensitivity of the sensors must be high, and they are subject to noise interference.

A typical solution, which assumes that pointing sticks frequently go out of calibration, is to interpret a variation below a certain threshold (over a given interval, perhaps one or several seconds) as being a neutral stick. However, the recalibration can also allow brief periods of 'drifting' (movement of the cursor while the user is not moving the pointing stick).

In practice, if the re-calibration interval is set too short and if the user applies moderately consistent pressure to the stick for such an interval, this method results in an incorrect zero point. Additional pressure again moves the cursor, but the calibration may occur again, requiring even more force. If the user releases pressure at this point, the change will be interpreted as an instruction to move the opposite direction. In time, the software will re-calibrate and stop the motion.

Additionally, if "press-to-select" is enabled, the software may generate unexpected click events by touching the pointing stick during typing.

History 

In 1984, Ted Selker, a researcher at PARC, worked on a pointing stick based on a study showing that it takes a typist 0.75 seconds to shift from the keyboard to the mouse, and comparable time to shift back. Selker built a model of a device that would minimize this time. It was only three years later, working at IBM, that Selker refined his design, resulting in the TrackPoint product for which IBM received US patents in 1996 and 2000.

Pointing sticks were the dominant pointing device for laptops before the advent of the touchpad. During later years, they faced a decline in popularity as most laptop-producing brands switched to touchpads, although as of 2021, some manufacturers like Lenovo still produce laptops with pointing sticks.

Problem scope

Space constraints

The pointing stick can be used in ultra-compact netbooks where there would be no place for a touchpad.

Finger motion reduction 
The pointing stick is positioned such that the hands do not need to be removed from the home row to manipulate the mouse pointer.

Continuous motion 
Some people find them more appealing for mobile gaming than a touchpad, because the trackpoint allows infinite movement without repositioning. This is because a user's finger may run off the edge of a touchpad while positioning the pointer, requiring them to reposition their finger in order to continue.

Ergonomics 
Some users feel that pointing sticks cause less wrist strain because a user does not need to avoid resting wrists on a touchpad, which are usually located just below the keyboard. One criticism is that because the pointing stick depends on the user's applying pressure, it can cause hand cramps (although this can be partly solved by setting the sensitivity higher and lifting the finger when the pointer is not being moved).
Another criticism is that it stresses the index finger and may lead to repetitive strain injury.

A number of ergonomic studies to compare trackpoint and touchpad performance have been performed. Most studies find that touchpad is slightly faster; one study found that "the touchpad was operated 15% faster than the trackpoint". Another study found that average object selection time was faster with a touchpad, 1.7 seconds compared to 2.2 seconds with a trackpoint, and object manipulation took 6.2 seconds with a touchpad, on average, against 8.1 seconds with trackpoint.

Naming and brands

Informal names 

Various informal names have been invented, including "nub", "clit mouse", which is an intercommunity term, usually seen on ThinkPad forums, and "nipple mouse".

Other uses 

While typically employed on a computer keyboard, IBM included one on its Trackpoint Mouse product; suggested uses included scrolling (as with a scroll wheel) or a dual-cursor system.

See also 
 Optical trackpad

References

External links 
 
 
 
 an OEM supplier for nubs: http://sofpoint.com/
 ALPS (manufacturer)
 Synaptics (manufacturer)

American inventions
Pointing devices